Kathy Whitman is an American politician serving as a member of the Montana House of Representatives from the 96th district. Elected in November 2020, she assumed office on January 4, 2021. Whitman has previously worked in the trucking and medical industries.

References 

Living people
Republican Party members of the Montana House of Representatives
Women state legislators in Montana
People from Missoula, Montana
Politicians from Missoula, Montana
1952 births
21st-century American women